The Department of Customs of Nepal is an administration of Government of Nepal under the Ministry of Finance which collects customs duty, Value Added Tax, excise and other taxes at the border points and international airport. The Department of Customs is responsible in contributing to the economic and social prosperity by providing professional and quality assured customs services in Nepal. Its mission is promoting and facilitating legitimate trade, protection of society and collecting the revenue.

Prevalence of customs has existed in Nepal since the Lichchhavi era. Before 1950, Tibet and India were Nepal's major trading partners. There were inner customs offices before 1950. However, the modern era of customs begun with the trade treaty with India in 1950; as a result, all inner customs were closed and borders offices started to work as customs offices.

Customs offices

At airport
Tribhuvan International Airport customs office, Kathmandu
Gautam Budha International Airport customs office, Bhairahawa

At border with India
Sathuli customs office,Kapilvastu District
Pashupatinagar customs office, Ilam District
Mechi customs office, Jhapa District
Biratnagar customs office,  Morang District
Sunsari customs office
Rajbiraj customs office
Siraha customs office
Janakpur customs office
Jaleshwar customs office
Sarlahi customs office
Gaur office
Birgunj office
Birgunj Inland Dry Port office
Bhairahwa office
Krisnanagar office
Koilabas office
Nepalgunj office
Rajpur office
Kailali office
Kanchanpur customs office
Mahakali

At border with China
Olangchungola customs office, Taplejung District
Kimathanka customs office
Lama bagar customs office
Tatopani customs office
Rasuwa customs office
Larke office
Mustang office
Mugu office
Yara naki office

See also
 List of Nepal government organizations

References

Taxation in Nepal
Government departments of Nepal
Customs services
1957 establishments in Nepal